Ghetto Love may refer to:

 Ghetto Love (album), a 2001 album by Jaheim, or the title song
 Ghetto Love (EP), a 2008 EP by Spinnerette, or its title song
 "Ghetto Love" (Da Brat song)
 "Ghetto Love" (Karl Wolf song), 2011
 "Ghetto Love", a song by Macy Gray from Big
 "Ghetto Love", a song by Mario from Go!
 "Ghetto Love", a song by Master P from MP da Last Don
 "Ghetto Love", a song by Swizz Beats featuring Mashonda and LL Cool J from Swizz Beatz Presents G.H.E.T.T.O. Stories
 "Ghetto Love", a song by Tech N9ne from Sickology 101